Yom Tov or Yom-Tov may refer to:

Judaism 
 Jewish holidays, (lit. "Good Day" in Hebrew Language)
 Yom tov sheni shel galuyot, a concept in halakha 
 Yom Tov Torah readings

People 
 Chananya Yom Tov Lipa (disambiguation) (name of two rabbis)
 David ben Yom Tov, medieval Catalan Jewish astronomer and astrologer
 David ben Yom Tov ibn Bilia, medieval Portuguese Jewish philosopher
 Jacob ben David ben Yom Tov, medieval Catalan Jewish astronomer and astrologer 
 Yom Tov Asevilli (1250 – 1330), medieval rabbi and Halakhist
 Yom Tov Ehrlich (1914 – 1990), Hasidic musician and composer
 Yom-Tov Lipmann Heller (1578 – 1654), Bohemian rabbi and Talmudist
 Yom Tov Lipman Lipkin (1846 – 1876), Lithuanian Jewish mathematician and inventor 
 Yom-Tov Lipmann-Muhlhausen, medieval Talmudist, kabalist and philosopher   
 Yom Tov of Joigny (d. 1190), medieval French-born rabbi and liturgical poet 
 Yom-Tov Samia, Israeli general
 Yom Tov Tzahalon (1559 – 1638), religious and legal scholar